Stjepan Poljak (born 17 November 1983 in Zabok, Croatia, SFR Yugoslavia) is a Croatian football midfielder, who plays for NK Zagorec Krapina.

Career
Poljak signed a three-year contract with Turkish Super League club Eskişehirspor in July 2008.

In July 2012 Poljak signed a two-year contract with Azerbaijan Premier League side Simurq. Poljak made his debut on 4 August 2012 in a 1–1 draw at home to Gabala, playing the full 90 minutes. His first goal for Simurq came in a 2–0 away victory over Khazar Lankaran on 20 September 2012, finishing the season with 4 goals in 29 league games. Poljak signed a new one-year contract, with the option of a second year, with Simurq during the summer of 2014.

Career statistics

References

External links
 

1983 births
Living people
People from Zabok
Association football midfielders
Croatian footballers
Croatia youth international footballers
NK Inter Zaprešić players
NK Slaven Belupo players
Eskişehirspor footballers
Simurq PIK players
Shamakhi FK players
NK Zagorec Krapina players
NK Vinogradar players
Croatian Football League players
Süper Lig players
Azerbaijan Premier League players
Croatian expatriate footballers
Expatriate footballers in Turkey
Croatian expatriate sportspeople in Turkey
Expatriate footballers in Azerbaijan
Croatian expatriate sportspeople in Azerbaijan